The Horned Serpent appears in the mythologies of many cultures including Native American peoples, European, and Near Eastern mythology. Details vary among cultures, with many of the stories associating the mystical figure with water, rain, lightning, thunder, and rebirth.     Horned Serpents were major components of the Southeastern Ceremonial Complex of North American prehistory.

In Native American cultures 

Horned serpents appear in the oral history of numerous Native American cultures, especially in the Southeastern Woodlands and Great Lakes.

Muscogee Creek traditions include a Horned Serpent and a Tie-Snake, estakwvnayv in the Muscogee Creek language. These are sometimes interpreted as being the same creature and sometimes different—similar, but the Horned Serpent is larger than the Tie-Snake. To the Muscogee people, the Horned Serpent is a type of underwater serpent covered with iridescent, crystalline scales and a single, large crystal in its forehead. Both the scales and crystals are prized for their powers of divination. The horns, called chitto gab-by, were used in medicine. Jackson Lewis, a Muscogee Creek informant to John R. Swanton, said, "This snake lives in the water has horns like the stag. It is not a bad snake. ... It does not harm human beings but seems to have a magnetic power over game." In stories, the Horned Serpent enjoyed eating sumac, Rhus glabra.

Alabama people call the Horned Serpent tcinto såktco or "crawfish snake", which they divide into four classifications based on its horns' colors, which can be blue, red, white, or yellow.

Yuchi people made effigies of the Horned Serpent as recently as 1905. An effigy was fashioned from stuffed deerhide, painted blue, with the antlers painted yellow. The Yuchi Big Turtle Dance honors the Horned Serpent's spirit, which was related to storms, thunder, lightning, disease, and rainbows.

Among Cherokee people, a Horned Serpent is called an uktena. Anthropologist James Mooney, describes the creature:

Those who know say the Uktena is a great snake, as large around as a tree trunk, with horns on its head, and a bright blazing crest like a diamond on its forehead, and scales glowing like sparks of fire. It has rings or spots of color along its whole length, and can not be wounded except by shooting in the seventh spot from the head, because under this spot are its heart and its life. The blazing diamond is called Ulun'suti—"Transparent"—and he who can win it may become the greatest wonder worker of the tribe. But it is worth a man's life to attempt it, for whoever is seen by the Uktena is so dazed by the bright light that he runs toward the snake instead of trying to escape. As if this were not enough, the breath of the Uktena is so pestilential, that no living creature can survive should they inhale the tiniest bit of the foul air expelled by the Uktena. Even to see the Uktena asleep is death, not to the hunter himself, but to his family.

According to Sioux belief, the Unhcegila (Ųȟcéǧila) are dangerous reptilian water monsters which lived in ancient times. They were of various shapes. In the end the Thunderbirds destroyed them, except for small species like snakes and lizards. This belief may have been inspired by finds of dinosaur fossils in Sioux tribal territory. The Thunderbird may have been inspired partly by finds of pterosaur skeletons.

Other known names 

 Sisiutl—  Kwakwaka'wakw 
 Awanyu—Tewa
 Djodi'kwado'—Iroquois
 Misi-kinepikw ("great snake")—Cree
 Msi-kinepikwa ("great snake")—Shawnee
 Misi-ginebig ("great snake")—Oji-Cree
 Mishi-ginebig ("great snake")—Ojibwe
 Pita-skog ("great snake")—Abenaki
 Sinti' Isht-Ahollo'—Chickasaw 
 Sinti Lapitta—Choctaw
 Unktehi or Unktehila—Dakota
 ʔU·lahkaha·p ("white snake")—Natchez
 Uktena—Aniyunwiya
mazacoatl - Nahuatl

Outside the Americas

In Europe

In Celtic iconography 

The ram-horned serpent was a cult image found in north-west Europe before and during the Roman period. It appears three times on the Gundestrup cauldron, and in Romano-Celtic Gaul was closely associated with the horned or antlered god Cernunnos, in whose company it is regularly depicted. This pairing is found as early as the fourth century BC in Northern Italy, where a huge antlered figure with torcs and a serpent was carved on the rocks in Val Camonica.

A bronze image at Étang-sur-Arroux and a stone sculpture at Sommerécourt depict Cernunnos' body encircled by two horned snakes which feed from bowls of fruit and corn-mash balanced in the god's lap. Also at Sommerécourt is a sculpture of a goddess holding a cornucopia and a pomegranate, with a horned serpent eating from a bowl of food. At Yzeures-sur-Creuse a carved youth has a ram-horned snake twined around his legs, with its head at his stomach. In a relief at a museum in Cirencester, Gloucestershire, Cernunnos' legs are depicted as two ram-horned snakes which rear up on each side of his head and are eating fruit or corn. 

According to Miranda Green, the snakes reflect the peaceful nature of the god, associated with nature and fruitfulness, and perhaps accentuate his association with regeneration.

Other deities occasionally accompanied by ram-horned serpents include "Celtic Mars" and "Celtic Mercury". The horned snake, and also conventional snakes, appear together with the solar wheel, apparently as attributes of the sun or sky god.

In Northern and Central Europe 
Variations on the horned serpent appear throughout the folklores of Northern and Central Europe. For example, there are the many incarnations of the Lindworm. There are tales of a serpent in Icelandic folklore known as the Lagarfljót Worm. While in Southern Sweden, there are claims of a huge water snake, the sight of which was deadly, called Storsjöodjuret . This latter characteristic is reminiscent of the basilisk.

Greek 

The cerastes is a creature described in Greek mythology as a snake with either two large ram-like horns or four pairs of smaller horns. Isidore of Seville described it as hunting by burying itself in sand while leaving its horns visible, and attacking creatures that came to investigate them.

In Mesopotamia
In Mesopotamian mythology, Ningishzida is sometimes depicted as a serpent with horns. In other depictions, he is shown as human but is accompanied by bashmu, mushussu, and ushumgal (three horned snakes in Akkadian mythology). Ningishzida shares the epithet, ushumgal, "great serpent", with several other Mesopotamian gods.

See also 
 Avanyu
 Amaru
 Chinese dragon
 Coi Coi-Vilu
 Feathered Serpent (deity)
 Kukulcan
 Lindworm
 Moñái
 Nāga
 Ophiotaurus
 Quetzalcoatl
 Sidewinder rattlesnake of the American Southwest, a living "horned serpent"
 Kitchi-at'Husis and Weewilmekq
 Tciptckaam
 Horned deity
 Piasa Bird, Alton, Illinois
 Sea goat

Notes

References 

 Grantham, Bill. Creation Myths and Legends of the Creek Indians. Gainesville: University of Florida Press, 2002. .
 Willoughby, Charles C. (1936). "The Cincinnati Tablet: An Interpretation". The Ohio State Archaeological and Historical Quarterly Vol. 45:257–264.

External links 

 Horned serpent, feathered serpent.
 Lakota creation myth involving Unktehi
 The Uktena And The Ulûñsû'tï

Anishinaabe mythology
Cree legendary creatures
Cherokee legendary creatures
Abenaki legendary creatures
Dragons
Legendary creatures of the indigenous peoples of North America
Legendary serpents
Mythological hybrids
Mythological monsters